James Gordon Harvey Sprigg (8 June 1896 – 2 December 1988) was an Australian rules footballer who played with St Kilda in the Victorian Football League (VFL).

Notes

External links 

1896 births
1989 deaths
Australian rules footballers from Victoria (Australia)
St Kilda Football Club players
People educated at Melbourne Grammar School
People educated at Geelong College